Liga Kobiet Polskich (League of Polish Women, LPW) was a state women's organization in Communist Poland, founded in 1945. 

It was a state organization and a branch of the Communist Party. It succeeded a Pre-war organisation founded in 1913 with a similar name, called the Liga Kobiet Polskich (Polish Women's League). 

Its purpose was to mobilise women in the political ideology of the state, as well as to enforce the party's policy within gender roles and women's rights. It played an important role in the life of women in the state during its existence. 

In 1989, it was dissolved and transformed into a new organisation under the name Democratic Union of Women (LK).

References

 Marilyn Rueschemeyer, Women in the Politics of Postcommunist Eastern Europe
 

Social history of Poland
Women's organisations based in Poland
Polish People's Republic
History of women in Poland
Feminist organizations in Europe
Political organizations
Organizations established in 1945
1989 disestablishments